A constitutional referendum was held in Mauritania and Senegal on 5 May 1946 as part of the wider French constitutional referendum. The proposed new constitution was approved by 92% of voters in the two territories, but was rejected by 53% of the overall vote. Voter turnout was 69.3%.

Results

References

1946 referendums
May 1946 events in Africa
1946 I
1946 in Mauritania
1946 I
1946 in Senegal